Eythora Elisabet Thorsdottir (born 10 August 1998) is a Dutch gymnast born to Icelandic parents. She competed at the 2016 Summer Olympics, where she finished ninth in the individual all-around, the highest placing ever for a gymnast from the Netherlands. At the 2017 European Championships, she won a silver medal on balance beam and a bronze medal on floor exercise.

Junior career

2012 
Eythora competed at the 2012 European Artistic Gymnastics Championships in Brussels and placed 10th in the all-around with a score of 52.731, 8th on balance beam with an 11.166, and 6th with the Dutch team with a total combined score of 157.361. Later in the year, she competed at the Dutch national championships in Rotterdam and placed 2nd in the all-around, 2nd on beam, and 1st on floor.

2013 
Eythora competed at the 2013 European Youth Summer Olympic Festival along with teammates Mara Titarsolej and Dana de Groot. They placed 9th as a team, and individually, she placed 9th in the all-around and 2nd on beam. Later that year, she became Dutch national champion on every event but floor.

Senior career

2014 
Eythora's international senior debut came late in the year, in a small meet in Hamburg, where she placed 1st in the all-around and 2nd with her team. She had been out most of the year due to a back injury.

2015 
At the beginning of the year, Eythora was among the gymnasts vying for a spot on the European Championships team. She competed at two qualifier meets and won both, thus earning a spot on the team. In preparation for the championships, she competed at the Ljubljana World Cup, placing 1st on floor. At the European Championships, she placed 12th in the all-around but did not make any event finals.

She later qualified to compete at the World Championships in Glasgow. There, she helped the Dutch team qualify for the 2016 Olympics by finishing 8th in the team competition. During the qualifications, she placed 28th in the all-around and was the first alternate for the finals. She qualified for the balance beam event final, but fell in the final and placed 8th.

2016 
Eythora started off the season at the International Gymnix in Canada, winning bronze on balance beam and placing fourth on floor exercise. She competed at the IAG SportEvent in May, winning every event except balance beam, where she placed fifth. She became Dutch National Champion in late June. She was named to the Dutch Olympic team in July.

Eythora was chosen to represent the Netherlands at the 2016 Summer Olympics in Rio de Janeiro, where she helped the Dutch team qualify to the team final. They finished in 7th place. She also qualified into the individual all-around final where she finished in 9th place with a score of 57.632. In November, she won silver in the all-around at the Arthur Gander Memorial in Spain.

2017 
In February, Eythora competed at the Reykjavik International Games, winning all-around and balance beam gold, vault and floor exercise silver, and uneven bars bronze. In April, she competed at the 2017 European Artistic Gymnastics Championships. In qualifications, she qualified for the individual all-around final, the balance beam final and the floor exercise final. In the individual all-around, she started well with vault, but a fall on the uneven bars and balance beam caused her to be lower in the rankings. She finished with a good floor exercise routine, and ended in 12th place. In the balance beam final, Eythora competed a clean routine and finished second behind Cătălina Ponor. In the floor exercise final, she finished in third place behind Angelina Melnikova and Ellie Downie. Thorsdottir competed at the 2017 World Championships but did not qualify for any individual apparatus finals.

2018 
Eythora returned to competition on 7–8 July to compete at the Heerenveen Friendly where the Netherlands placed second in the team final. She was added to the team to compete at the 2018 European Championships but had to withdraw after she broke her hand. Additionally she was not able to compete at the World Championships because of the same injury.

In mid-November Eythora competed at the Arthur Gander Memorial in Chiasso, Switzerland.  She won bronze in the 3-event all-around behind Jade Barbosa and Flavia Saraiva of Brazil.

2019 
In March Eythora competed at the EnBW DTB-Pokal Team Challenge in Stuttgart where she helped the Netherlands place third in the team final.  Individually she also won bronze in the all-around.  In April she competed at the European Championships where she placed thirteenth in the all-around but won silver on floor exercise, finishing behind Mélanie de Jesus dos Santos of France.

In August Eythora competed at the Heerenveen Friendly where she helped the Netherlands win silver in the team competition behind Italy and individually she finished second in the all-around behind Italian Giorgia Villa.  The following month she competed at the Second Heerenveen Friendly where she helped the Netherlands finish first.  Individually she placed third in the all-around behind compatriot Naomi Visser and Giulia Steingruber of Switzerland.

2021 
Eythora represented the Netherlands at the 2020 Summer Olympics in Tokyo, along with Vera van Pol, and Lieke and Sanne Wevers. In the qualification round, she fell on her balance beam mount and received a score of 12.333.  The Dutch team finished 11th in qualifications. Eythora received an all-around score of 52.899 and was named the second reserve for the all-around final.

Competitive history

References 

1998 births
Living people
Dutch female artistic gymnasts
Dutch people of Icelandic descent
Gymnasts at the 2016 Summer Olympics
Olympic gymnasts of the Netherlands
Sportspeople from Rotterdam
Gymnasts at the 2020 Summer Olympics